Kinihiriya Mal (Fire Flies) is a 2001 Sri Lankan Sinhala romantic drama film directed by H.D. Premaratne as his last film and produced by Soma Edirisinghe for EAP Films. It film stars large number of artists where Kamal Addararachchi and Sangeetha Weeraratne in lead roles along with Vasanthi Chathurani and Roger Seneviratne. Music composed by Rohana Weerasinghe. It is the 953rd Sri Lankan film in the Sinhala cinema.

Plot

Cast
 Kamal Addararachchi as Sanka
 Sangeetha Weeraratne as Sanduni / Jean
 Vasanthi Chathurani as Renuka
 Roger Seneviratne as Vijitha
 Sanoja Bibile as Princey
 Asoka Peiris as Renuka's father
 Pradeep Senanayaka as Gadaya
 Tony Ranasinghe as Edwin
 Iranganie Serasinghe as Sylvia Madam
 Ellen Sylvester as Sophie Nona
 Nilanthi Wijesinghe as Girley
 Daya Thennakoon as Amadoris 
 Ramani Fonseka as Renuka's mother
 Gnananga Gunawardhana as Brothel customer
 Saman Hemarathna as Pavement hawker
 Saman Almeida as Almeida
 Keerthi Ranjith Peiris as Village uncle
 Grace Ariyawimal as Sanduni's mother
 Damitha Saluwadana as Brothel handler
 Corrine Almeida as Club singer
 Veena Jayakody as Brothel receptionist
 Susila Kottage as Factory overseer
 Lal Kularatne as Kavi Mudalali
 Premila Kuruppu as Princey's Mother
 Ronnie Leitch as Mr. Shopman
 Somasiri Colombage as Waiter
 Gunadasa Madurasinghe		
 Simon Navagattegama		
 Nimal Anthony

Production
The film has been shot around Colombo and last scenes at two hotels, Sapphire Hotel and Galadari Hotel. Shooting completed at the mid of April 1999. Heavy shooting were conducted in and around Galewela area before the monsoon rains. The film was the last film to be completed during 1999 at Film Corporation Studios Dalugama as the last film of the Millennium.

Dileepa Abeysekere, who is the son of late lyricist Karunaratne Abeysekera made his debut as a lyricist in this film along with Wasantha Kumara Kobawaka. Soma Edirisinghe produced the film as 14th production, whereas 17th film directed by H.D. Premaratne. Editing and other post productions were completed in August 1999 to make arrangements to screen the film before the Public Performances Board (PPB). The film was prepared to be released with another movie directed by H.D. Premaratne, Mandakini.

Reception
The film has received mixed reviews from critics.

References

External links
 
 Kinihiriya Mal on YouTube
 සඳ මිරිඟු‍ දියේ වැටිලා

2001 films
2000s Sinhala-language films
2001 romantic drama films
Sri Lankan romantic drama films